Vlora Beđeti (born 22 October 1991) is a Slovenian judoka of Albanian origin.

References

External links

 

1991 births
Living people
Slovenian female judoka
European Games bronze medalists for Slovenia
European Games medalists in judo
Judoka at the 2015 European Games
Mediterranean Games gold medalists for Slovenia
Competitors at the 2013 Mediterranean Games
Mediterranean Games medalists in judo